Fiction International is a literary magazine devoted to innovative forms of fiction and non-fiction which addresses progressive political ideals. Founded at St. Lawrence University in New York City by Joe David Bellamyin 1973, the magazine moved to San Diego State University in 1983, where it has been "edited by Harold Jaffe and Larry McCaffery until 1992, when Harold Jaffe assumed sole editorship". Over the years, the magazine has published works by Harold Jaffe, J.M. Coetzee, Claribel Alegría, Robert Coover, William S. Burroughs, Alberto Moravia, Malcolm X, Allen Ginsberg, Marguerite Duras, Edmund White, Kathy Acker, Eckhard Gerdes, Alain Robbe-Grillet, Clarice Lispector, and Roque Dalton.

References

External links
 Official Website
 Fiction International Blog

Literary magazines published in the United States
Annual magazines published in the United States
Magazines established in 1973
Magazines published in New York City
Magazines published in California